In linear algebra, a reducing subspace  of a linear map  from a Hilbert space  to itself is an invariant subspace of  whose orthogonal complement  is also an invariant subspace of  That is,  and  One says that the subspace  reduces the map 

One says that a linear map is reducible if it has a nontrivial reducing subspace. Otherwise one says it is irreducible.

with  where , and

References 

Linear algebra
Matrices